Lawrence Gill Fenerty, aka "Gill the Thrill", (born August 24, 1963) is a former running back in the Canadian Football League, National Football League, and the Italian Football League.

Fenerty graduated from Jesuit High School (New Orleans) and attended the College of the Holy Cross, where in 1983 he had an amazing game, rushing for 337 yards (on 18 carries) and 6 touchdowns versus Columbia University in a 77 to 28 victory. He is the program's all-time leading rusher with 3,680 yards. 

Fenerty started his professional career in 1986 playing in the Italian Football League for the Bolzano Jets, where he rushed for 610 yards in the second half of the regular season in (5 games). He helped the Jets win two playoff games before losing in the league semi finals to the Bologna Warriors.

In his first year with Toronto, 1987, he rushed for 879 yards and caught 53 passes, winning the CFL's Most Outstanding Rookie Award. He also scored a thrilling 61-yard touchdown reception in the Argos last second loss in the classic 75th Grey Cup game. In 1988, he would rush for 968 and catch 51 passes. On August 31 of that year, Fenerty rushed for a team record 215 yards in a single game against the Calgary Stampeders, eclipsing Ulysses Curtis' 36-year-old team record by seven yards.  In 1989, Fenerty set a then team record with 1247 yards rushing. He was a CFL all star selection in every season he played, totalling 48 games.

Fenerty moved to his hometown to play for the New Orleans Saints of the National Football League for the 1990 through 1993 seasons. He would play 31 games, rushing for 335 yards in 1990 and 477 in 1991, also catching 44 passes in the two years, as well as returning punts and kickoffs. He spent 1992 and 1993 on the Saints injured reserve with knee operations.

He ended his career with a brief stint with the CFL expansion Shreveport Pirates in 1994.

References

1963 births
Living people
Players of American football from New Orleans 
Players of Canadian football from New Orleans
American football running backs
College of the Holy Cross alumni
American expatriate sportspeople in Italy
American players of Canadian football
Canadian football running backs
Toronto Argonauts players
New Orleans Saints players
Shreveport Pirates players
Holy Cross Crusaders football players
Canadian Football League Rookie of the Year Award winners
American expatriate players of American football